Sing, Memory is the debut album from British Black Box Recorder vocalist, Sarah Nixey. Recorded in London, and produced by James Banbury, the album is split into two halves, Sing and Memory. The title is probably a reference to Vladimir Nabokov's autobiography, Speak, Memory. It was released in the UK on 19 February 2007.

The album includes the five singles: "The Collector", "Love & Exile", "Strangelove", "When I'm Here With You" and "The Black Hit Of Space". The first two were released as a double-A side exclusive download in mid-2006. "Strangelove" was released on 7" vinyl and CD, backed by remixes of "The Collector". "When I'm Here With You" also preceded the album on 29 January 2007. "The Black Hit of Space", released on 9 July 2007, is a cover version of The Human League's track from their Travelogue album (1980).

Track listing
 "Sing" Prelude (Sarah Nixey, James Banbury, Paul Morley)
 "When I'm Here With You" (Nixey, Paul Statham)
 "Beautiful Oblivion" (Nixey, Banbury)
 "Strangelove" (Sing Version) (Nixey, Banbury, Mark Lodge, Pete Hofmann)
 "Hotel Room" (Nixey, Banbury, Morley)
 "Nothing On Earth" (Hannah Robinson, Morley)
 "Nightshift" (Michel Smordynia)
 "Memory" Prelude (Nixey, Banbury, Morley)
 "The Collector" (Nixey, Banbury)
 "Breathe In, Fade Out" (Nixey, Banbury)
 "Endless Circles" (Nixey, Statham)
 "The Man I Knew" (Nixey, Banbury)
 "Masquerade" (Nixey, Banbury)
 "Love & Exile" (Nixey, Banbury)
 "The Black Hit of Space" (Ian Craig Marsh, Martyn Ware, Philip Adrian Wright, Philip Oakley)

Personnel
Sarah Nixey - vocals
James Banbury - keyboards, programming
Tim Weller - drums

References

2007 debut albums
Sarah Nixey albums